Noah and Nelly in... SkylArk is a British children's animated television series produced by Bob Godfrey's Movie Emporium. it was broadcast on BBC1 on 13 September 1976 to 1977.

Introduction
Noah and Nelly was created by Grange Calveley, writer of the earlier and better known Roobarb cartoon. The five-minute films depict a world loosely based around Noah's Ark. However, Calveley's surreal interpretation involves two-headed talking animals reminiscent of the pushmi-pullyu known to Doctor Dolittle. Each animal has a cheerful, optimistic head at one end and an unhappy, pessimistic head at the other. Even the SkylArk itself is a longship with a figurehead at either end, one smiling, the other frowning. Although there is only one animal of each type, they are referred to in the plural - Brian the lions and Rose the Elephants. As with the earlier Roobarb, the main narration is provided by British actor Richard Briers. However, co-narrator Peter Hawkins manages to find a different and appropriate voice for each of the many animals.

Story
The story follows roughly the same pattern in each episode. Captain Nutty Noah consults his map – which is completely blank except for a compass marking in the top right-hand corner – and randomly picks out a place to visit. The SkylArk is then shown travelling to its destination by balloon, on wheels, underwater with snorkelling figureheads, or occasionally even by sea. On arriving at their destination, the SkylArk's crew find various strange inhabitants such as talking television sets who are suffering some kind of problem they can't solve themselves (for example, the television sets are stuck showing the news over and over again and getting bored). The animals often help in some way, but the day is invariably saved by Noah's wife Nelly, who uses her knitting skills to create machines which solve the problem in some way. Nelly knits everything from drilling rigs to crash helmets; her supply of wool seems almost inexhaustible, but she occasionally has to unravel the ship's sails when she runs out.

Production

The illustration style used in Noah and Nelly appears to have developed from the style used for Roobarb, but cel animation is used where Roobarb had marker drawings. Although this technique is arguably more polished, it does not create the same degree of "boiling" (i.e., deliberate misalignment of successive frames of animation) that was used to such innovative effect in the earlier series. Producer Bob Godfrey seems to have deliberately gone back to a more rough and ready style for his third cartoon series Henry's Cat, which was also better known than Noah and Nelly. It seems that more mainstream production techniques may have led to Noah and Nelly's ending up less famous than its siblings, in spite of its unique storyline and witty script. Equally, however, it could simply be down to the fact that Noah and Nelly was not repeated anywhere near as frequently as its stablemates; its final repeat run (which only covered selected episodes, not the full 26) was in 1980, a mere four years after it began, and it has not been shown on British television since. By contrast, both Roobarb and Henry's Cat were repeated into the 1990s and beyond.

Episodes
During a Savings Week
During the Time We Were Here
During Tea
During a Long Time Ago
During a Stay at Reservoir Desert
During Something and Nothing
During a Smashing Time
During a Very Damp Spell
During a Steam Up
During a Flower Show
During a Wail of a Time
During a Sweep Stake
During a Very Funny Day
During a Stay at Clockword Canyon
During Lunch
During a Splashing Time
During a Frame Up
During a Reading Lesson
During a String of Events
During a Very High Flight
During a Jumpy Time
During a Journey Abroad
During a Fishing Holiday
During a Seasonal Time
During a Wild Day
During One Afternoon
During a Quiet Time

Home releases
The series was released on two VHS tapes in the mid 1990s.

References

External links

The Chestnut: Noah and Nelly in... SkylArk

1976 British television series debuts
1977 British television series endings
1970s British children's television series
BBC children's television shows
British children's animated adventure television series
Noah's Ark in television
English-language television shows
1970s British animated television series